Cameras in the Sky is an album by American singer and songwriter Sam Phillips. It is the sixth release from her digital subscription program The Long Play.

Track listing
All songs written by Sam Phillips. 
"Tell Me"
"Broken Circle"
"Happy Mediums"
"Leap Towards the Earth"
"Throw Yourself Away"
"Little White Feet"
"Hide Space"
"Cameras in the Sky"
"When I'm a Camera"
"So Glad You're Here"

Personnel
 Sam Phillips – vocals, guitar, drums, piano
 Eric Gorfain – viola, violin, guitar, piano, drums, keyboards
 Greg Leisz – electric guitar
 Chris Bruce – electric guitar
 Jennifer Condos – bass
 Jay Bellerose – drums, percussion
 The Section Quartet – string section
Eric Gorfain – violin, viola
Daphne Chen – violin
Lauren Chipman – viola
Richard Dodd – cello

External links
Sam Phillips: The Long Play

Sam Phillips (musician) albums
2011 albums